Ludwig Wolff (August 31, 1886, Sélestat – May 17th, 1950, Neustadt in Holstein) was a German General der Flieger in the Luftwaffe during World War II.

Life

Early years and World War
On May 24, 1904, Wolff joined the 2. Ober-Elsässiches Infanterie-Regiment Nr. 171 of the Prussian army a. During the First World War, he initially served as a company commander, and later until 27 October 1916 as regimental adjutant. Then until 25 February 1917, Wolff served in the staff of the Chief of the field railways. On February 26, 1918, he was reassigned to the staff of the 5th Guards Infantry Division, where he remained until July 19, 1917. Then acted Wolff of 20 July 1917 to 2 September 1917 in the first staff of the German military missions in the Ottoman Empire and until April 30, 1918 Chief of General Staff of the Turkish Army 8th.

In May 1918 he returned to Germany and was held by the end of this month for use in Chief of the General Staff of the Army. To May 31, 1918 Wolff transferred to the staff of the Army High Command 2 , where he remained until the beginning of July 1918. This was followed on 4 July 1918, the end of the war and until the January 3, 1919 to be serve on the staff of the Army High Command 4 . to January 4, 1919 Wolff returned, now promoted to captain, to the 2nd Upper Alsace Infantry Regiment Nr. 171 back, where he remained until his demobilization remained late January 1919.

Reichswehr
During the Weimar Republic Wolff was first from 22 January to the end of September 1919 at the General Staff of the V. Army Corps used. He was subsequently used by 14 February 1920 the General Staff of the Military District Command IV and VI. Following Wolff served until the end of May 1920 Staff of the Reichswehr Cavalry Brigade 31 and then to the end of June 1922 of the General Staff . 6 Division . From 1 July 1922 until the end of April 1924, he worked as an advisor in the Ministry of Defense .

To May 1, 1924 Wolff became a company commander in the 9th (Prussian) Infantry Regiment appointed whose fortunes he led until the end of January 1927. He then worked until the end of September in 1930 in the General Staff of group commands 2, from October 1930 to the end of September 1933 the staff of Artillery Leader I and from 1 October 1933 to the end of February the 1934 Staff of the 11th (Saxon) Infantry Regiment used.

Wehrmacht
On March 1, 1934 Wolff joined the nascent air force and was under construction there at first by the end of this month in the Ministry of Aviation incorporated. On 1 April 1934 he was appointed chief of staff of the air circuit commands V, which post he held until the end of September 1937. He was from 1 November 1936 at the same time deputy commander of the atmosphere V. Then he was from 1 October 1937 to the end of June 1938 Higher flier commander 5 and thereafter from 1 July 1938 to 31 March 1939 the commander 5 Air Division.

World War II
Wolff has held only one function from 1 April 1939 until the war ended. He acted as Commanding General and Commander-in Luftgau XI with headquarters in Hannover, which is March 1940 in Hamburg and was awarded in his name to honor Shield Luftgau XI. He was the successor of Max Mohr (a former subordinate of Wolff), who had held that position before him. Wolff came with his staff on 3 May 1945 in Hamburg in British captivity, from which he was released in February 1948.

Awards

Iron Cross 1st Class (1914)
Iron Cross 2nd Class  (1914)
Knight's Cross with Swords of Royal House Order of Hohenzollern
Military Merit Cross 3rd Class with War Decoration
Silver Liakat Medal with Swords
Gallipoli Star
Clasp to the Iron Cross (1939) 1st Class

Clasp to the Iron Cross (1939) 2nd Class
Anti-Aircraft Flak Battle Badge
Observer Badge
War Merit Cross 1st Class with Swords
War Merit Cross 2nd Class with Swords
Knight's Cross of the War Merit Cross with Swords on September 27, 1943 as General der Flieger

References 

1886 births
1950 deaths
People from Sélestat
People from Alsace-Lorraine
Generals of Aviators
Prussian Army personnel
Luftstreitkräfte personnel
Luftwaffe World War II generals
German Army personnel of World War I